Akrivi is a singer and songwriter, best known for her music contributions in series and films. Her music has been featured on US networks Showtime Networks, CBS, A&E, Freeform (TV channel), in various shows like The Good Wife, The Fosters (2013 TV series), The Glades, House of Lies, Younger (TV series), The Bold and the Beautiful and also in the Sony Pictures film The Night Before and Rough Night. She has released a double collection of her work in 2015, Precious Collection Volume 1 & 2'', featuring songs in English, Greek and Spanish. Akrivi was born in Greece and has been residing in the United Kingdom.

Early life
Born in Greece, Akrivi moved to the United Kingdom to study psychology.

References
Soundtrack, The Good Wife
 Entertainment Weekly: TV Jukebox: 6 songs to remember from TV this week
Soundtrack, The Night Before
https://musicbrainz.org/artist/e7426dfd-db3d-4e2f-af13-d99d5f2ed003

External links
 
 
 

Living people
21st-century Greek women singers
Greek women singer-songwriters
English-language singers from Greece
Greek pop singers
Singers from Thessaloniki
Year of birth missing (living people)